Coptomia is a genus of flower chafers, a group of scarab beetles, comprising the subfamily Cetoniinae.

References

External links 
 
 
 

Cetoniinae
Scarabaeidae genera